American River is a whitewater river of California.

American River may also refer to:

Rivers  
 American River (Agiapuk River tributary), in Alaska
 American River (Washington), a tributary of the Bumping River in Washington

Populated places 
 American River, South Australia, a town on Kangaroo Island in South Australia

Other
 American River College
 American River Parkway
 American River Transportation Company